Alexander H. Wells (died December 21, 1857 in Sing Sing, Westchester County, New York) was an American lawyer, editor and politician from New York.

Life
He was born in Cambridge, Washington County, New York as the son of Daniel Wells who had removed there from Hebron, Connecticut.

He was Surrogate of Westchester County from 1840 to 1844.

He published the Hudson River Chronicle at the village of Sing Sing, and the Troy Daily Times. In his papers he attacked the conditions of the prisoners in Sing Sing State Prison.

 
At the New York state election, 1848, he was elected on the Whig ticket an Inspector of State Prisons. He was in office from 1849 to 1851, but was defeated for re-election in 1851.

Sources
The New York Civil List compiled by Franklin Benjamin Hough (pages 45 and 419; Weed, Parsons and Co., 1858)

Year of birth missing
1857 deaths
People from Cambridge, New York
People from Ossining, New York
New York State Prison Inspectors
19th-century American newspaper editors
New York (state) state court judges
New York (state) Whigs
19th-century American politicians